The pistole vz. 24 (Pistol Model 24) was the standard Czech Army pistol of the inter-war period. It was an improved version of the pistole vz. 22, which had been licensed from Mauser. Slovakia seized over ten thousand vz. 24s when it declared its independence from Czechoslovakia in March 1939. The vz. 24 was succeeded in production by a simplified version chambered in .32 ACP, the vz. 27.

Notes

References

See also 

 Weapons of Czechoslovakia interwar period

External links
 Overview of Ceska Zbrojovka History and Handgun Production

Semi-automatic pistols of Czechoslovakia
World War II infantry weapons
.32 ACP semi-automatic pistols
Military equipment introduced in the 1920s